Karatovo (Qarat) is a rural locality (a selo) and the administrative centre of Karatovsky Selsoviet, Tuymazinsky District, Bashkortostan, Russia. The population was 267 as of 2010. There are 3 streets.

Geography 
Karatovo is located 40 km southwest of Tuymazy (the district's administrative centre) by road. Isergapovo is the nearest rural locality.

References 

Rural localities in Tuymazinsky District